MV Ulysses is a RORO car ferry currently owned and operated by Irish Ferries. The ship was launched on 1 September 2000 at Aker Finnyards shipyard in Rauma, Finland and services the Dublin–Holyhead route.

The vessel stands 12 decks high, at a height of 167.5 feet (approx 51 metres) from keel to mast. The vessel has five vehicle decks, including a stowable mezzanine deck consisting of two 'swing decks', called 'Plates', which are lowered to accommodate a greater number of 'low vehicles' (i.e. vehicles up to 2 metres high) - these swing decks are primarily used in holiday seasons when there is a much greater number of passenger vehicles. When launched she was the world's largest car ferry in terms of vehicle capacity.

Design 
Ulysses was designed by Aker Finnyards and based on their Cruise Ferry 4000 concept design. She can carry 2,000 passengers and crew, 1,342 cars or 241 articulated trucks and trailers (or a mix of cars and freight vehicles). She has 228 passenger berths in 96 cabins, with passenger space spread over 12 decks.

She also has three thrusters at the bow and one at the stern to aid in maneuvering.

History
Irish Ferries ordered Ulysses from Aker Finnyards in late 1999.  She was laid down on 24 January 2000 and launched on 1 September.
She was handed over to her owners, Irish Continental Group, at the Rauma yard on 22 February 2001, leaving under the command of Captain Peter Ferguson on 28 February and arriving in Dublin Bay at 07:00 on Sunday 4 March.  The naming ceremony was undertaken by swimmer Mairead Berry.

Following the 2003 sailing season, Ulysses underwent a refit at the A&P Group's Birkenhead shipyard.  She has sailed on Irish Ferries' Dublin–Holyhead route for her entire career, uninterrupted until the 2018 season when she suffered mechanical problems with her starboard propeller, requiring drydock repairs that took several weeks in June and July.

Replacement 
On 2 January 2018, Irish Continental Group (ICG) announced that they had entered into an agreement with Flensburger Schiffbau-Gesellschaft & Co.KG ("FSG") whereby the German yard will build a new ferry for the Dublin–Holyhead service at a contract price of €165.2m. Upon completion, like Ulysses was, the new ship will be the largest cruise ferry in the world in terms of vehicle capacity.  According to ICG, the new vessel will offer a 50% increase in peak capacity over Ulysses, with capacity for 330 freight units or 1,500 cars and 1800 passengers and crew.  On the arrival of the new vessel, scheduled for mid-2020, Ulysses, will move to the schedule of the chartered RoPax Epsilon.

Gallery

References

Specific

External links

M/F Ulysses - The ferry site
Ulysses - Irish Ferries

Ships built in Rauma, Finland
Ferries of the Republic of Ireland
2000 ships
Ro-ro ships